Mai Hontama (本玉真唯) (born 30 August 1999) is a Japanese tennis player. Hontama has a career-high singles ranking by the WTA of 126, achieved on 7 March 2022. She also has a career-high WTA doubles ranking of world No. 374, set on 9 January 2023.

Career
Hontama made her WTA Tour main-draw debut at the 2021 Chicago Fall Tennis Classic, after qualifying for the main draw. She reached the quarterfinals, defeating former world No. 4, Caroline Garcia, in the first round, before falling to Garbiñe Muguruza.

She made her Grand Slam debut at the 2022 Wimbledon Championships where she recorded her first major win in her career over Clara Tauson.

Sponsorship
Hontama wears Lacoste clothing, and uses Tecnifibre racquets.

Performance timeline

Only main-draw results in WTA Tour, Grand Slam tournaments, Fed Cup/Billie Jean King Cup and Olympic Games are included in win–loss records.

Singles
Current through the 2023 Australian Open.

ITF Circuit finals

Singles: 7 (3 titles, 4 runner–ups)

Doubles: 5 (2 titles, 3 runner-ups)

Notes

References

External links

1999 births
Living people
People from Machida, Tokyo
Japanese female tennis players
20th-century Japanese women
21st-century Japanese women